is a railway station on the Iwate Ginga Railway Line in Ichinohe, Iwate Prefecture, Japan, operated by the third-sector railway operator Iwate Ginga Railway Company.

Lines
Kotsunagi Station is served by the Iwate Ginga Railway Line, and is located 52.2 kilometers from the starting point of the line at Morioka Station and 587.5 kilometers from Tokyo Station.

Station layout
Kotsunagi Station has two opposed ground-level side platforms connected to the station building by an overhead crossing. The station is staffed.

Platforms

Adjacent stations

History
The station opened on 21 September 1909, on the site of a watering stop for steam locomotives that existed since 31 December 1904. The station was absorbed into the JR East network upon the privatization of Japanese National Railways (JNR) on 1 April 1987, and was transferred to the Iwate Ginga Railway on 1 September 2002.

Passenger statistics
In fiscal 2015, the station was used by an average of 16 passengers daily.

Surrounding area
  National Route 4

See also
 List of Railway Stations in Japan

References

External links

  

Railway stations in Iwate Prefecture
Iwate Galaxy Railway Line
Railway stations in Japan opened in 1909
Ichinohe, Iwate